Mr. Texas is a 1951 American Western film directed by Dick Ross, starring Redd Harper and Cindy Walker. Evangelist Billy Graham called it "the first Christian Western".

Cast 
 Redd Harper as Jim Tyler
 Cindy Walker as Kay
 Billy Graham as himself
 Cliff Barrows
 Grade Wilson
 Jerry Beavan
 George Beverly Shea
 Paul Mickelson
 Tedd Smith

References

External links 
 https://www.imdb.com/title/tt7814732/
 Billy Graham's "Mr. Texas" Film Premiere, Hollywood Bowl, 1951 – Los Angeles Examiner Collection, 1920-1961

1951 films
1951 Western (genre) films
American Western (genre) films
Billy Graham
Films directed by Dick Ross (director)
1950s English-language films
1950s American films